The Machipongo River is a  river in Accomack County on the Eastern Shore of the U.S. state of Virginia.

See also
List of rivers of Virginia

References

USGS Hydrologic Unit Map – State of Virginia (1974)

Rivers of Virginia
Rivers of Accomack County, Virginia